Andromenes may refer to:

Andromenes (Macedonian), a Macedonian nobleman and father of four sons: Amyntas, Attalus, Polemon and Simmias
Andromenes of Corinth, Olympic stadion winner in 304 and 308